is a Japanese TV announcer and presenter. Her father is Norwegian and she became a naturalized Japanese citizen at the age of 6.

After graduating from Gakushuin University, Mona joined the Asahi Broadcasting Corporation as an announcer. She presented the TV series Jackass in Japan. In September 2006 she worked for five days on the Tokyo Broadcasting System news program News23 before stepping down due to a love affair with married Democratic Party of Japan executive Goshi Hosono.

Returning to television in 2008 as an anchor for Fuji Television News she lost her job after visiting a love hotel with married sportsman Tomohiro Nioka of the Yomiuri Giants baseball team.

In 2010 she married the president of a real estate investment company. She briefly returned to entertainment in 2011 before announcing her retirement from public life.

References

External links 

 "True Self", her blog

1976 births
Living people
People from Hiroshima Prefecture
Gakushuin University alumni
Japanese television personalities
Japanese people of Norwegian descent
Naturalized citizens of Japan
People from Onomichi, Hiroshima